The Tamworth is a British breed of domestic pig. It is the only red-coloured British pig. Its origins are unknown, but it appears to have developed near the town of Tamworth in south-eastern Staffordshire, close to Warwickshire border. It is one of seven British pig breeds listed by the Rare Breeds Survival Trust as 'priority', the highest level of concern of the trust.

History 

The origins of the Tamworth are not known. It appears to have originated shortly before or after 1800 near the town of Tamworth in south-eastern Staffordshire, close to Warwickshire border. There are many theories of the origin of its unusual red colouration: that it derived from a wild jungle pig (Sus scrofa cristatus) brought from India by Sir Francis Lawley; that it derived from Irish pigs known as 'Irish Grazers', brought to  Drayton Manor in Drayton Bassett by Sir Robert Peel; that Peel had not used these, but a boar brought from the West Indies; or that the colour was due to a West African Guinea Hog descended from pigs from Portugal, or to a red pig imported in about 1750 from Barbados. The colour may have been fixed by selective breeding alone.

The Tamworth was recognised as a breed in 1865 and entered at the Royal Show in that year. A herd-book was started in 1885, and a breed society, the Tamworth Incorporated Pig Breeders Association, was formed in 1906.

Tamworths were imported into the United States by Thomas Bennett of Rossville, Illinois, in 1882.  Soon they entered Canada where they have also endured. Breed associations for Tamworth swine are active in the UK, the USA, and Canada. Farmers in each country much favour other pigs in quantity. From 1913 to mid-century, the breed reached peak numbers in Canada, reaching up to 10% of total swine.  In Australia, the breed reached peak numbers of about 1000 in the mid-20th century. In New Zealand there were five breeding sows in 2002; in 2021 it was listed as "priority" by the Rare Breeds Conservation Society of New Zealand.

Characteristics 

The Tamworth has a long snout, a slightly dished or concave profile, and prick ears. The coat is long, fine and straight and of a ginger or red-gold colour, preferably without black hair; the skin is flesh-coloured and should carry no black spots.

These pigs have characteristically long necks and legs, deep sides, and narrow backs. Their ham structures are quite muscular and firm. The breed is known for having an excellent foot structure and a good skeletal system. Litter sizes are typically somewhat smaller than those of commercial breeds. Unacceptable features, according to breed aficionados, are: curly hair, a coarse mane, a turned-up nose, and dark spots on the coat.

Gallery

References

Further reading 

 James AS Watson and James A More, Agriculture: the science and practice of British farming,  4th ed. revised and enlarged, Edinburgh, Oliver and Boyd (1937)
 Annette and Grant McFarlane, Pig keeping on a small scale,  Kenthurst, NSW,  Kangaroo Press (1996).
 J van Der Pol.., Today’s hog won’t work outdoors, Graze. (reproduced in Genesis vol.16, No.3, 2001)

Conservation Priority Breeds of the Livestock Conservancy
Pig breeds originating in England
Animal breeds on the RBST Watchlist